The G Line (formerly the Orange Line) is a bus rapid transit line in Los Angeles, California, operated by the Los Angeles County Metropolitan Transportation Authority (Metro). The  G Line uses a dedicated, exclusive right-of-way for the entirety of its route with 17 stations located at approximately  intervals; fares are paid via TAP cards at vending machines on station platforms before boarding to improve performance. It is one of the two lines in the Los Angeles Metro Busway system.

The line, which opened on October 29, 2005, follows part of the Southern Pacific Railroad's former Burbank Branch Line, which provided passenger rail service from 1904 to 1920; it was subsequently used by Pacific Electric streetcars from 1911 to 1952. At North Hollywood station, the G Line connects with the B Line subway, which offers service to Downtown Los Angeles via Hollywood. The Metro Orange Line bicycle path runs alongside part of the route.

In 2020, the line was renamed from Orange Line to the G Line while retaining the color orange in its square icon as part of a complete renaming of lines by Metro.

Service description
Because of its many differences from standard bus service, Metro has branded the G Line as part of the region's network of light and heavy rail lines, and it appears on the same system map as the rail lines. The buses are painted in the silver-and-gray color scheme of Metro Rail vehicles. The G Line is rarely referred to by its line number (901), but it sometimes appears on documents and destination signage.

The G Line's icon color, and former Orange Line name, were inspired by the many citrus trees that once blanketed the San Fernando Valley. In the planning stages, the G Line was known as the San Fernando Valley East-West Transitway and later the Metro Rapidway.

Operation
G Line buses operate 24 hours a day.  At peak hours (between 6 am and 7 pm eastbound, 5 am and 6 pm westbound), every other bus is a short turn, only operating between North Hollywood and Canoga station.

Station list
The following is the complete list of stations, from west to east.

Ridership

History

The majority of the G Line is built on part of the former Southern Pacific Railroad Burbank branch, part of which saw Pacific Electric Red Car service (see San Fernando Line and Owensmouth Line); passenger service on this segment ended in 1952, but the right-of-way remained undeveloped and was acquired by Metro in 1991. As the Metro Rail system was being designed in the 1990s, initial plans were to build an extension of the Metro Red Line there, since the purchased right-of-way's eastern terminus was at the site of the planned North Hollywood station. However, political developments stymied these plans: community objections to surface transit along the route resulted in a 1991 law mandating that any line along the route be built as a deep-bore tunnel, but a 1998 ballot measure driven by perceptions of mismanagement banned the use of county sales tax to fund subway tunneling.

Then-County Supervisor Zev Yaroslavsky said they initially mirrored the busway concept based on a similar transit system he, then-Mayor Richard Riordan, and other elected officials toured in Curitiba, Brazil.

On June 23, 2009 construction began on a  extension from Canoga northward along the Southern Pacific trackbed to the Metrolink station in Chatsworth. This created two branches at the western end of the line beyond Canoga station; the older branch proceeded outside the busway on city streets to Warner Center. In 2018, this branch was eliminated and replaced with a frequent service local shuttle, leaving the entirety of the Orange Line on the dedicated right-of-way.

Proposed developments

Grade separation and crossing gates
In the first year that the busway was open, there were ten injury collisions between vehicles and buses, which were heavily covered in the media. Metro noted that the buses had about the same accident rate as other bus lines in the city on a per-mile basis, and has stated that the line's accident rate is "less than half" of Metro's entire fleet of buses. They also pointed out that the A Line also had a significant number of collisions in its early years.

Starting in December 2005, red light cameras were installed at most intersections.

As part of the enhancement package to the LA Metro system approved by voters in 2016 with Measure M, in October 2017, Metro recommended a series of improvements to the Orange Line. These include quad-crossing gates at 34 intersections and constructing a mile-long elevated section between Sepulveda and Van Nuys Boulevard. These improvements would eliminate much of the time Orange Line buses spend waiting at red lights, would allow buses to cross intersections at higher speeds, and cut end-to-end travel time along the entire route by 29%.

Metro advertised a design–build project in February 2022 to convert 41 existing signalized intersections on the G Line from transit signal priority to preemption using railroad-grade-crossing-style gates and flashing light signals (similar to the prototype proof of concept at the Hayvenhurst Avenue pedestrian crossing). The project also calls for building an aerial busway and two aerial stations to grade separate three other intersections (Sepulveda, Vesper, and Van Nuys). The plans require all work to be compatible with the future conversion of the busway to the light rail. Pre-construction has started with the LADWP burying the aerial power lines at the busway intersection with Sepulveda in Van Nuys. As of October 2022, Metro expects construction to begin in 2023, and the project will be completed in 2026.

Capacity enhancements 
There is concern that the G Line will soon reach its engineered capacity and has exceeded its designed capacity during peak periods. Adding more buses requires platooning (running convoys of two or more buses together), similar to what rail achieves in having multiple cars per train. And while the proposed change in the previous project from priority to preemption at signalized intersections will decrease delays to G Line buses, it will come at the cost of increasing cross-street travel times and reducing their capacity since priority balances the timing needs of busway traffic with cross-traffic versus the more disruptive railroad-style preemption. Another alternative involves using longer vehicles to increase each bus's capacity. In 2015, California passed a bill allowing buses up to 82 feet long to operate on the G Line busway (longer than the existing 65-foot-long articulated buses.)

Conversion to light rail
This price would include both upgraded infrastructure and the purchase of rail vehicles. The report noted that if not upgraded in some way shortly, the G Line would soon reach capacity at rush hours. Full conversion to light rail is planned to take place by 2050. Different braking distances of LRT vs. BRT might be an essential concern of safety tests.

Incidents
On October 27, 2005, two days before the line's official opening, a motorist driving with a suspended license ran a red light and collided with an eastbound bus at Vesper Avenue. There were no injuries.

In November 2005, there were two collision-caused injuries. In the first, a fare inspector on the bus was taken to a hospital for minor injuries after a 65-year-old female driver made an illegal right turn against a red light and struck an Orange Line bus near the crossing at Corbin Avenue in Reseda. In the second, one person was seriously injured and 14 others hospitalized after an elderly motorist ran a red light while using a mobile phone. After the second collision, Metro instructed all buses to slow down at intersections and installed white strobe lights on the sides of the buses to improve visibility. They said they would review any and all ideas to improve safety on the line.

In October 2006, a delivery truck hit the side of a bus. One person was seriously injured, and 16 received minor injuries.

Fleet

The G Line has a dedicated fleet of  articulated buses that each carry up to 57 passengers—about 50% more than  non-articulated buses—and have three doors (versus two on non-articulated buses). The G Line uses a proof-of-payment system whereby fares are paid before boarding, so the buses do not have any onboard fare collection equipment. The G Line fleet is stored and maintained at Metro's Division 8 depot in Chatsworth, which has direct access to the busway.

The original G Line fleet ran on compressed natural gas (CNG). In 2021, the CNG fleet was replaced with 40 New Flyer Xcelsior XE60 battery-electric articulated buses. Additional features of the battery-electric buses include dual air conditioning units, two additional hub-mounted motors on the middle axle, an active suspension system, USB charging ports at each seat, and public Wi-Fi. They also lack the large cooling fans of the CNG buses, which makes them quieter.

Both types of chargers have overhead pantographs that connect to roof-mounted contacts on the buses. The depot chargers use a one-to-many scheme, whereby 150 kW from a single charger is distributed to multiple overhead pantographs. The electrification project cost , including the buses ( each), charging equipment, and infrastructure improvements.

Bike path

The Orange Line Bikeway is active transportation bicycle path that shares the right-of-way with the G Line buses.

See also

List of Los Angeles Metro Busway stations
List of Los Angeles bike  paths

References

External links

G Line page at LA Metro
LA Metro: Orange Line Extension –  extension under construction from Canoga Station north to Chatsworth Metrolink Station (2012).
Orange Line history
Light Rail Now: "A Bus by Any Other Name Is Still ... a Train ? " – by The Light Rail Now project.
Biking the Orange Line

G Line (Los Angeles Metro)
Los Angeles Metro Busway
G Line
Public transportation in Los Angeles
Transportation in the San Fernando Valley
Rail trails in California
Proposed railway lines in California
2005 establishments in California
Transport infrastructure completed in 2005